Dieter Arend (14 August 1914 – ?) was a German rower who competed in the 1936 Summer Olympics.

In 1936 he won the gold medal as coxswain of the German boat in the coxed pair competition.

References

Dieter Arend's profile at databaseOlympics
Listing as "deceased" 

1914 births
Year of death missing
Coxswains (rowing)
Olympic rowers of Germany
Rowers at the 1936 Summer Olympics
Olympic gold medalists for Germany
Olympic medalists in rowing
German male rowers
Medalists at the 1936 Summer Olympics